19(1)(a) is a 2022 Indian Malayalam-language drama film written and directed by debutant Indhu V. S. It stars Nithya Menen, Vijay Sethupathi, and Indrajith Sukumaran. The film is produced by Anto Joseph and Neeta Pinto. The film marks Vijay Sethupathi's debut in a character role in Malayalam and his second Malayalam film after Maarconi Mathaai. The film released directly on the OTT platform Disney+ Hotstar on 29 July 2022 and received mixed reviews.

Synopsis
The mundane life of an acquiescent lady (who could be anybody) who is running a photocopy shop goes into a tailspin when a revolutionary writer leaves the manuscript of his unpublished novel with her.
The movie's title references the below: 
Article 19(1) in The Constitution Of India 1949
(1) All citizens shall have the right
(a) to freedom of speech and expression;

Cast
Nithya Menen 
Vijay Sethupathi as Gauri Shankar
Indrajith Sukumaran as Anand Manmadhan
Indrans as Mohanan, a police officer 
Srikant Murali as Gangettan
Bhagath Manuel as Sakhavu Hareendran
Deepak Parambol as Ismail Ibrahim, police officer 
Abhishek Raveendran
Athulya Ashadam as Fathima
Sreelakshmi as Sarojini, Gauri Shankar's sister
Arya K. Salim as Jenny Philip

Production
19(1)(a) is produced by Anto Joseph Film Company and it marks the directorial debut of Indhu V.S. It also marks the debut of Vijay Sethupathi in Malayalam in a character role. The film's shooting was completed in January 2021.

Release
In April 2021, director Indhu V. S. announced that the film would not be having theatrical release due to COVID-19 pandemic and was looking for an OTT release. The film released directly on Disney+ Hotstar on 29 July 2022.

Reception

For Firstpost, film critic Anna M. M. Vetticad ranked it ninth in her year-end list of best Malayalam films.

References

2020s Malayalam-language films
2022 direct-to-video films
2022 directorial debut films
2022 drama films
2022 films
Disney+ Hotstar original films
Films about freedom of expression
Films about writers
Films scored by Govind Vasantha
Films shot in Kerala
Indian direct-to-video films
Indian drama films